Marco is the second studio album by Marco Antonio Solís. It was released on September 30, 1997. It was nominated for a Lo Nuestro Award for Pop Album of the Year.

Track listing

All songs written and composed by Marco Antonio Solís, except where otherwise noted

Chart performance

Sales and certifications

References

External links
Official website
 Marco Antonio Solís album on social.zune.net

1997 albums
Marco Antonio Solís albums
Fonovisa Records albums